The 2019 Sporting Kansas City season is the twenty-fourth season of the team's existence in Major League Soccer and the ninth year played under the Sporting Kansas City moniker.

It was the first season since 2010 where Sporting did not qualify for the playoffs.

Summary

Preseason

Sporting Kansas City opened its preseason camp in Scottsdale, Arizona, in early January to prepare for the CONCACAF Champions League. Players slept in specialized tents on their beds that would simulate higher-elevation air pressure in order to adjust their bodies for a high-elevation match in Toluca, Mexico.

Current roster

Player movement

In 

Per Major League Soccer and club policies terms of the deals do not get disclosed.

Draft picks 
Draft picks are not automatically signed to the team roster. Only trades involving draft picks and executed after the start of 2019 MLS SuperDraft will be listed in the notes.

Out

Short Term Agreements 
Per Major League Soccer and club policies terms of the deals do not get disclosed.

In

Loans 
Per Major League Soccer and club policies terms of the deals do not get disclosed.

Out

Competitions

Preseason
Kickoff times are in CST (UTC-06) unless shown otherwise

Mobile Mini Sun Cup 

Kickoff times are in CST (UTC-06) unless shown otherwise

CONCACAF Champions League

Round of 16
Kickoff times are in CST (UTC-06) unless shown otherwise

Quarterfinals
Kickoff times are in CST (UTC-06) unless shown otherwise

Semifinals 
Kickoff times are in CST (UTC-06) unless shown otherwise

U.S. Open Cup

Regular season 

Kickoff times are in CDT (UTC-06) unless shown otherwise

Standings

Western Conference

Overall table

Results by round

Player statistics

Squad appearances and goals
Last updated on 16 September 2019.

|-
! colspan="14" style="background:#dcdcdc; text-align:center"|Goalkeepers

|-
! colspan="14" style="background:#dcdcdc; text-align:center"|Defenders

|-
! colspan="14" style="background:#dcdcdc; text-align:center"|Midfielders

|-
! colspan="14" style="background:#dcdcdc; text-align:center"|Forwards

|-
! colspan=14 style=background:#dcdcdc; text-align:center| Players who have made an appearance or had a squad number this season but have left the club

|-
|}

0+1 means player did came on as a sub once. 1+1 means player started once and came on as a sub once.

Top scorers 

As of October 19, 2019

Disciplinary record 

As of September 16, 2019

Injury record

References

Sporting Kansas City seasons
Sporting
Sporting Kansas City
Sporting Kansas
Sporting